The London International Mime Festival (LIMF) is an annual theatre event in London.  Its directors, Joseph Seelig and Helen Lannaghan, are winners of the International Theatre Institute Award for Excellence.

LIMF features live art, a new circus, clown, object, and physical theatre at various central London venues. It was established in 1977 as a one-off event at the Cockpit Theatre, by the theatre's manager Joseph Seelig and Australian mime artist Nola Rae.

The festival is the longest-running event of its kind in the world.

Critical reception 
Donald Hutera of The Times stated, "The aesthetic outlook of the London International Mime Festival, founded in 1977, remains evergreen, varied, and vital. The works of physical/visual theatre programmed by its astute co-directors enliven the typically bone-chilling post-holiday doldrums." 

According to Andrew Haydon of The Guardian, “LIMF now functions as a very high-level international festival of dance, circus, and puppet theatre. The shows have been carefully selected and curated, so whatever you see is likely to be, at the very least, inventive and interesting.”

Awards 
The festival’s productions and its two directors have received three Olivier Award nominations, the Total Theatre lifetime achievement award in 2012, and the 2017 Empty Space Peter Brook Award for Special Achievement.

References

External links 

 
 2003 interview with Joseph Seelig in the Independent newspaper

Theatre festivals in England
Festivals in London
Circus festivals